International Red Aid (also commonly known by its Russian acronym MOPR (for: Междунаро́дная организа́ция по́мощи борца́м револю́ции - Mezhdunarodnaya organizatsiya pomoshchi bortsam revolyutsii - literally: "International organisation for assistance to fighters for revolution")) was an international  social-service organization. MOPR was founded in 1922 by the Communist International to function as an "international political Red Cross", providing material and moral aid to radical "class-war" political prisoners around the world.

Organizational history

Formation
The International Workers Aid society, known colloquially by its Russian-language acronym, MOPR, was established in 1922 in response to the directive of the 4th World Congress of the Comintern to appeal to all communist parties "to assist in the creation of organizations to render material and moral aid to all captives of capitalism in prison."

Julian Marchlewski-Karski was named chairman of the Central Committee of MOPR, the governing body of the new organization. After 1924, the name of this directing body was changed to the Executive Committee.

The first plenary session of the Central Committee of MOPR was held in June 1923 in Moscow. At this gathering it was determined that MOPR should establish sections in all countries, particularly those suffering from the White Terror against the revolutionary movement.

Development
The first international conference of MOPR took place in July 1924, simultaneously with the 5th World Congress of the Comintern.

According to Elena Stasova, the head of the Russian section of MOPR and deputy head of the Central Committee of the International organization, as of January 1, 1928, MOPR had a total membership of 8,900,000 people in 44 national sections. By January 1, 1931, MOPR's scope had grown to 58 national organizations, with a total membership of 8,305,454, according to Stasova. At the latter date the international organization maintained a total of 56 periodicals in 19 languages, Stasova stated.

Stasova noted that two forms of the organization existed, "mass organizations" — such as those of the USSR, Germany, France, the United States — and "organizations of a committee type", which limited themselves to legal and material aid to political prisoners and their families without attempting to establish large-scale membership organizations.

Stasova emphasized the ongoing difference between MOPR and Workers International Relief, another branch of the Comintern's international apparatus. "The difference is this", she noted in 1931, "we are assisting the political prisoners and the Workers International Relief assists at the time of economic strikes, at the time of the economic struggle."

The 1st World Congress of MOPR was held in November 1932. At that gathering it was announced that as of January 1 of that year, MOPR had established 67 national sections outside of the USSR, with 1,278,274 members.

Termination

MOPR was headed by Elena Stasova until 1938, after which time its international character was deemphasized.

National histories

As of 1924, the organization had national affiliates in nineteen countries. By 1932, it claimed sixty-two affiliates (excluding the Soviet Union) with a total of 1,278,274 individual members.

Spain
The International Red Aid made its first appearance in Spain as a charity organization during the workers’ revolt of October 1934 in Asturias. It provided aid to those imprisoned for their role in the rebellion, and organize amnesty campaigns for prisoners that were to be executed.

The organization, which included many artists and writers, was later re-formed and expanded in Barcelona in January 1936, with the aim of opposing fascism on multiple fronts.

Activities during the Spanish Civil War

During the Spanish Civil War, the writer Joaquín Arderíus served as the organization's president before exiling himself to France and then Mexico. The SRI created soup kitchens and refugee camps throughout the territory controlled by the Republicans, and also provided libraries for Republican soldiers, but many of their programs; as well as the food and aid that it collected- were focused on providing aid for children.  For example, the SRI founded the Escuela Nacional para Niños Anormales (National School for Mentally Disabled Children) in Madrid, with 150 students. It also founded a Children's Park on the outskirts of Madrid, providing shelter to an additional 150 children.

Other activities included:
The building of transportation networks between hospitals and the front.
The transformation of various buildings (convents, churches, palaces) into makeshift hospitals, clinics, blood banks, orphanages, and schools.

Medical contributions included the establishment of 275 hospitals, ambulance services, the establishment of the Orthodontics Clinic and College, dental hygiene campaigns, and the mobilization of dentists to the front. The Workers' Party of Marxist Unification (POUM), a minor Marxist party in Spain at the time, organized a parallel Socorro Rojo del P.O.U.M. in opposition to the International Red Aid.

Military activities

The ranks of the Fifth Regiment (dissolved 21 January 1937), established by the Communist Party of Spain at the outbreak of the Civil War, were also swelled by members of the SRI. The Fifth Regiment, based on the Soviet Red Army, included Juan Modesto and Enrique Líster amongst its leaders, and fought primarily in the battles in and around Madrid throughout 1936. 
The SRI also helped Communist sympathizers in Nationalist Spain make their way to friendly territory.

The insignia of the SRI consisted of an "S" (for Socorro) behind the bars of a prison.

Netherlands
The Dutch section of International Red Aid held its first congress in 1926. The same year it began publishing Rode Hulp.

Finland
The Red Aid of Finland was active during the 1930s, led by the Communist Party of Finland. It gave assistance to revolutionary prisoners in Finnish jails. Women connected to Red Aid would make handicraft works and organized bazaars, in order to finance the activities of the organization. The organization also tried to mobilize public opinion against ill-treatment of the prisoners. The Red Aid of Finland published Vankien Toveri.

Latin America
Towards the ends of the 1920s, Farabundo Martí became the leader of the International Red Aid in Latin America. Julio Antonio Mella, the Cuban communist leader exiled in Mexico since 1926, was a leading figure in the Mexican section of the organization.

Soviet Union
The largest section of MOPR was its Soviet branch, which accounted for the majority of the organization's international membership. MOPR organized numerous lotteries and fundraising drives.

Korea
Yi Donghwi was a prominent MOPR organizer.

Madagascar
A MOPR branch was formed in Madagascar in 1933.

Leadership
From 1927 to 1937, MOPR's president was Elena Stasova.

Congresses of MOPR

{| class="wikitable"
|-
! Year
! Name
! Location
! Dates
! Delegates
|-
! 1923
| align="center" | 1st Plenary Session of the CC of MOPR
| align="center" | Moscow
| align="center" | June 
| align="center" |
|-
! 1924
| align="center" | 1st International Conference
| align="center" | Moscow
| align="center" | July 14–16
| align="center" | 109 (91 CP, 13 YCI, 5 non-party)
|-
! 1927
| align="center" | 2nd International Conference
| align="center" | Moscow
| align="center" | March 24-April 5
| align="center" | 
|-
! 1932
| align="center" | 1st World Congress
| align="center" | Moscow
| align="center" | November
| align="center" |
|-
|}

National Affiliates of MOPR
 Principal source: James Martin Ryle, International Red Aid, 1922-1928, pp. 262-263.

{| class="wikitable"
|-
! Country
! Group name
! Establishment date
! Comments
|-
| align="center" | Albania
| align="center" | 
| align="center" | 
| align="center" |
|-
| align="center" | Algeria
| align="center" | 
| align="center" | "before 1928"
| align="center" |
|-
| align="center" | Argentina
| align="center" | 
| align="center" | 1926
| align="center" |
|-
| align="center" | Australia
| align="center" | 
| align="center" | 1928
| align="center" |
|-
| align="center" | Austria
| align="center" | Austrian Red Aid (Österreichische Rote Hilfe)
| align="center" | 1924
| align="center" |
|-
| align="center" | Belgium
| align="center" | 
| align="center" | Aug. 1925
| align="center" |
|-
| align="center" | Bolivia
| align="center" | 
| align="center" | "before 1933"
| align="center" |
|-
| align="center" | Brazil
| align="center" | 
| align="center" | 1927
| align="center" |
|-
| align="center" | British Guiana
| align="center" | 
| align="center" | 
| align="center" |
|-
| align="center" | Bulgaria
| align="center" | Organization for Support to the Victims of the Capitalist Dictatorship
| align="center" | Sept. 1923
| align="center" |
|-
| align="center" | Canada
| align="center" | Canadian Labour Defense League
| align="center" | Aug. 1925
| align="center" |
|-
| align="center" | Chile
| align="center" | 
| align="center" | 1930
| align="center" |
|-
| align="center" | China
| align="center" | Society of Aid
| align="center" | Oct. 1925
| align="center" |
|-
| align="center" | Colombia
| align="center" | 
| align="center" | 1932
| align="center" |
|-
| align="center" | Costa Rica
| align="center" | 
| align="center" | 1932
| align="center" |
|-
| align="center" | Cuba
| align="center" | 
| align="center" | 1929
| align="center" |
|-
| align="center" | Czechoslovakia
| align="center" | 
| align="center" | Feb. 1925
| align="center" |
|-
| align="center" | Denmark
| align="center" | 
| align="center" | 1923
| align="center" |
|-
| align="center" | Ecuador
| align="center" | 
| align="center" | "before 1933"
| align="center" |
|-
| align="center" | Egypt
| align="center" | 
| align="center" | 1928
| align="center" |
|-
| align="center" | El Salvador
| align="center" | 
| align="center" | "before 1933"
| align="center" |
|-
| align="center" | Estonia
| align="center" | 
| align="center" | 1923
| align="center" |
|-
| align="center" | Finland
| align="center" | Finnish Red Aid (Suomen Punainen Apu)
| align="center" | 1924
| align="center" |
|-
| align="center" | Formosa
| align="center" | 
| align="center" | 1930
| align="center" |
|-
| align="center" | France
| align="center" | Secours Rouge International
| align="center" | 1923
| align="center" |
|-
| align="center" | Germany
| align="center" | Red Aid of Germany (Rote Hilfe Deutschlands)
| align="center" | Oct. 1924
| align="center" |
|-
| align="center" | Great Britain
| align="center" | International Class War Prisoners' Aid
| align="center" | 1925
| align="center" |
|-
| align="center" | Greece
| align="center" | Workers' Aid
| align="center" | 1923
| align="center" | 
|-
| align="center" | Guatemala
| align="center" | 
| align="center" | 1928
| align="center" | 
|-
| align="center" | Haiti
| align="center" | 
| align="center" | 1928
| align="center" | 
|-
| align="center" | Hawaii
| align="center" | 
| align="center" | 
| align="center" | 
|-
| align="center" | Hungary
| align="center" | 
| align="center" | 
| align="center" | 
|-
| align="center" | Iceland
| align="center" | 
| align="center" | 
| align="center" | 
|-
| align="center" | India
| align="center" | 
| align="center" | "after 1928"
| align="center" | 
|-
| align="center" | Indo-China
| align="center" | 
| align="center" | 
| align="center" | 
|-
| align="center" | Indonesia
| align="center" | 
| align="center" | 1928
| align="center" | 
|-
| align="center" | Ireland
| align="center" | 
| align="center" | 1928
| align="center" | 
|-
| align="center" | Isle of Timor
| align="center" | 
| align="center" | 1933
| align="center" | 
|-
| align="center" | Italy
| align="center" | 
| align="center" | April 1923
| align="center" | 
|-
| align="center" | Japan
| align="center" | Nekon Sekishoku Kyuenkai
| align="center" | 1928
| align="center" | 
|-
| align="center" | Java
| align="center" | 
| align="center" | 
| align="center" | 
|-
| align="center" | Korea
| align="center" | 
| align="center" | Jan. 1926
| align="center" | 
|-
| align="center" | Latvia
| align="center" | 
| align="center" | 
| align="center" | 
|-
| align="center" | Lithuania
| align="center" | Lithuanian Red Aid
| align="center" | 1918
| align="center" | 
|-
| align="center" | Madagascar
| align="center" | 
| align="center" | "before 1933"
| align="center" | 
|-
| align="center" | Mexico
| align="center" | League for Support of Persecuted Fighters
| align="center" | April 1925
| align="center" | 
|-
| align="center" | Mongolia
| align="center" | 
| align="center" | 1928
| align="center" | 
|-
| align="center" | Morocco
| align="center" | 
| align="center" | 1928
| align="center" | 
|-
| align="center" | Netherlands
| align="center" | Red Aid of Holland (Roode Hulp Holland)
| align="center" | Feb. 1925
| align="center" | 
|-
| align="center" | New Zealand
| align="center" | 
| align="center" | 1928
| align="center" | 
|-
| align="center" | Norway
| align="center" | Norwegian Red Aid (Norges Roede Hjelp)
| align="center" | 
| align="center" | 
|-
| align="center" | Palestine
| align="center" | 
| align="center" | 1924
| align="center" | 
|-
| align="center" | Panama
| align="center" | 
| align="center" | "before 1933"
| align="center" | 
|-
| align="center" | Persia
| align="center" | 
| align="center" | 1928
| align="center" | 
|-
| align="center" | Peru
| align="center" | 
| align="center" | "before 1933"
| align="center" | 
|-
| align="center" | Philippines
| align="center" | 
| align="center" | "before 1933"
| align="center" | 
|-
| align="center" | Poland
| align="center" | Red Aid of Poland (Czerwona Pomoc w Polsce)
| align="center" | 1925
| align="center" | 
|-
| align="center" | Portugal
| align="center" | 
| align="center" | 1925
| align="center" | 
|-
| align="center" | Puerto Rico
| align="center" | 
| align="center" | 
| align="center" | 
|-
| align="center" | Romania
| align="center" | 
| align="center" | 
| align="center" | 
|-
| align="center" | South Africa
| align="center" | Ikaka la Basebenzi
| align="center" | 1928
| align="center" | 
|-
| align="center" | Spain
| align="center" | 
| align="center" | Sept. 1925
| align="center" | 
|-
| align="center" | Sweden
| align="center" | International Red Aid, Swedish Section
| align="center" | 
| align="center" | 
|-
| align="center" | Switzerland
| align="center" | 
| align="center" | 1923
| align="center" | 
|-
| align="center" | Syria
| align="center" | 
| align="center" | "before 1933"
| align="center" | 
|-
| align="center" | Trinidad
| align="center" | 
| align="center" | 
| align="center" | 
|-
| align="center" | Tunisia
| align="center" | 
| align="center" | 1928
| align="center" | 
|-
| align="center" | Turkey
| align="center" | 
| align="center" | 
| align="center" | 
|-
| align="center" | United States of America
| align="center" | International Labor Defense
| align="center" | 1925
| align="center" | 
|-
| align="center" | Uruguay
| align="center" | 
| align="center" | Feb. 1926
| align="center" | 
|-
| align="center" | Union of Soviet Socialist Republics
| align="center" | International Society for Aid to Revolutionary Fighters (MOPR)
| align="center" | 1922
| align="center" | 
|-
| align="center" | Venezuela
| align="center" | 
| align="center" | 1931
| align="center" | 
|-
| align="center" | Yugoslavia
| align="center" | 
| align="center" | March 1924
| align="center" | 
|-
|}

See also

 Anarchist Black Cross
 International Association of Democratic Lawyers
 International Labor Defense
 Partisan Defense Committee
 Rote Hilfe e.V.
 Workers International Relief (aka Mezhrabpom), established by the Comintern in 1921 to channel international aid to Soviet Russia during the famine

Footnotes

Further reading
 James Martin Ryle, International Red Aid, 1922-1928: The Founding of a Comintern Front Organization. PhD dissertation. Atlanta, GA: Emory University, 1967.

Organisations of the Spanish Civil War
Organizations based in the Soviet Union
Comintern
Legal advocacy organizations